Saddle Butte can refer to several places in the United States.

 Saddle Butte, Montana, a census-designated place
Saddle Butte (Carter County, Montana) in Carter County, Montana
Saddle Butte (Hill County, Montana) in Hill County, Montana
Saddle Butte (Phillips County, Montana) in Phillips County, Montana
 Saddle Butte (Wyoming)
 Saddle Butte (Volcano in Oregon)